Paloma Villegas (born 1951) is a Mexican writer and translator and winner of the prestigious Sor Juana Inés de la Cruz Prize for her 2004 novel, Agosto y fuga (August Escape). She has translated over 20 books into Spanish.

Biography 
Paloma Villegas was born in Mexico City in 1951. She studied Spanish language and literature at the Faculty of Philosophy and Letters of the National Autonomous University of Mexico, and worked as a professor at the Autonomous Metropolitan University. She on the editorial board of Cuadernos Político, and has been a member of  since 1988. She has been a literary critic for various magazines and cultural supplements. She won the 2005 Sor Juana Inés de la Cruz Prize for Agosto y fuga. She has translated numerous books in Mexico and Spain.

Bibliography 
 Mapas (1981), a book of poetry
 La luz oblicua (1995), 
 Agosto y fuga (2004),

References 

Mexican women academics
Mexican women novelists
Mexican women poets
20th-century Mexican educators
20th-century Mexican poets
20th-century Mexican novelists
20th-century Mexican women writers
21st-century Mexican poets
21st-century Mexican novelists
21st-century Mexican women writers
National Autonomous University of Mexico alumni
Writers from Mexico City
1951 births
Living people
20th-century women educators